Diuris bracteata is a species of orchid which is endemic to New South Wales. It has two folded leaves and up to eight yellow flowers with blackish marks. After its collection in a Sydney suburb in 1888, no further collections were made and the species was presumed extinct until 2004 when it was rediscovered near Gosford.

Description
There are about five curved, linear bracts along the flowering stem. Flowering occurs in August and September.

Taxonomy and naming
Diuris bracteata was first formally described in 1888 by Robert D. FitzGerald from a specimen collected near Gladesville by Henry Deane. The description was published in Fitzgerald's book, Australian Orchids. The specific epithet (bracteata) is a Latin word meaning "small leaf".

Distribution and habitat
This orchid occurs in grassy woodland and forest near Gosford.

Conservation
No specimens of this species were collected in the twentieth century and in the year 2000 it was listed as "extinct" under the Australian Government Environment Protection and Biodiversity Conservation Act 1999 (EPBC Act). Some specimens collected in the Sydney region in 1998 and subsequently, have been re-examined and found to be Diuris platichila. The species is listed as "endangered" under the New South Wales Biodiversity Conservation Act 2016. The threats to its survival include its small population size and limited distribution, and disturbance associated with roadworks since some populations occur on roadsides.

References

bracteata
Orchids of New South Wales
Flora of New South Wales
Plants described in 1888